The VIII Army Corps was a mixed corps of the army of the German Confederation (the Bundesheer), which was made up of contingents from Württemberg, Baden and Hesse. Until 1830  contingents from Hohenzollern-Sigmaringen, Hohenzollern-Hechingen and Liechtenstein also belonged to this corps.

Organisation 
The Corps was intended to assemble on mobilisation. In peacetime no specific units or formations were assigned to it; only the strengths of the individual contingents were laid down.

The commandant of the mixed corps was appointed by joint agreement of the contributing nations. The individual states appointed the commanders of the subordinate units.

The lack of standardization of the Bundesheer was also reflected in the VIII Corps. It had no standard regulations, the rank badges differed from another as did the "promotion criteria, wages and salaries, the rations, the norms for general service and the operation of the military justice system, the lengths of service and the methods of reimbursement were also different. ...even in 1859 the Württemberg attack signal was the same as the Baden signal to withdraw.". The VIII Army Corps only had an understanding of the need to introduce weapons of the same calibre and train in joint manoeuvres.

ORBAT 
The Corps had a planned ORBAT of two divisions each of two brigades, each with two regiments.

Strength 
The planned strengths of the contingents are given below 

In addition, until 1830 there were the following:

Wartime service 
The Corps' mobilisation for the Crimean War in 1855 and the Upper Italian War in 1859 both proved to be a disaster. "An atmosphere of depressing amateurism reigned at the  headquarters of the VIII Army Corps in Stuttgart; this applied even more to its  troops which had few trained or even useful men. The mobilised army conveyed the impression of a rusty mess. Although it had given itself three months to mobilise instead of the allocated four weeks, it was still only partly ready for war."

In the First Schleswig War of 1848–1851 and in the fighting in the Baden Revolution only individual elements of the Corps from the contingent-sending states were deployed (e.g. the Neckar Corps).

Austro-Prussian War of 1866 
In the Austro-Prussian War the Corps took part in the Campaign of the Main. But even the appointment of the commander of the VIII Army Corps led to conflict between the "allies" in 1866. Both Prince William of Baden (the younger brother of Grand Duke Frederick), as well as Prince Frederick of Württemberg (a cousin of the King of Württemberg) contended for the command. Austria, however, wanted to fill the post with its own candidate and pushed for the appointment of one of the allied officers in Austrian service, Lieutenant Field Marshal Alexander of Hesse-Darmstadt. This was eventually accepted under duress after Austria had released him from his oath of allegiance to Austria. This appointment was then made on 14 June 1866 by King Charles I of Württemberg, who had the formal right to do so. Alexander received his appointment on 16 June and was sworn in on 18 June in Darmstadt. In his own words he accepted the command "with very little hope and only extremely unwillingly." The chief of the general staff was the Württemberg lieutenant general, Fidel von Baur-Breitenfeld. The army corps was not fully up to strength until 9 July (i.e. about a week after the decisive Battle of Königgrätz). After the  VIII Corps had also been allocated troops from the Electorate of Hesse, the Duchy of Nassau and an Austrian brigade, units of 6 sovereign states were now members of this formation. As early as 9 August - after a failed campaign - Alexander resigned his command and felt it necessary to publish his campaign journal in order to defend himself from the numerous attacks on his leadership. The Corps, together with the VII Army Corps of the Confederation, which was entirely made up of Bavarian Army troops, formed the "West German Army". This was placed on 28 June 1866 under the command of the 71-year-old Prince Charles of Bavaria. Its chief of the general staff was Ludwig von der Tann-Rathsamhausen - an opponent of the German "war of brothers".

On 1 June 1866 military representatives of the south German central powers met in Munich. Baden, Württemberg and Hesse-Darmstadt pledged about 45,000 men for the campaign - in fact these states only provided ca. 35,000 men, and then only in early August instead of mid-June. After the Battle of Königgrätz they lost the will for unity, so that the Campaign of the Main was doomed to failure from the start and the battles of Frohnhofen, Aschaffenburg, Hundheim, Tauberbischofsheim, Werbach and Gerchsheim were merely an accompaniment to the efforts already initiated everywhere to establish a cease-fire, with each of the central powers only pursuing its own interests.

Nevertheless, the losses of the corps amounted to 402 dead, 1,439 wounded, 118 prisoners 2,444 missing; the number of missing men almost certainly including more deaths.

Gallery 
Order of Battle of the VIII Federal Army Corps in contemporary illustrations:

References

Footnotes

Literature 
 Heinrich A. Eckert: Das deutsche Bundesheer. Munich, 1835
 Unknown South German publisher: Das Heerwesen der Staaten des deutschen Bundes, Augsburg, 1838
 Vereinigung der Freunde des Wehrgeschichtlichen Museums Schloß Rastatt e.V., publ.: Unter dem Greifen, Altbadisches Militär von der Vereinigung der Markgrafschaften bis zur Reichsgründung  1771 – 1870, Braun Druckerei und Verlage Karlsruhe, 1984
 Willi A. Boelcke: Handbuch Baden-Württemberg, Verlag Kohlhammer Stuttgart, 1982, 
 Militärgeschichtliches Forschungsamt(Hrsg): Handbuch zur Deutschen Militärgeschichte 1648 – 1939, Bernard & Graefe Verlag für Wehrwesen München, 1975, 1 vol., IV  Militärgeschichte im 19. Jahrhundert 1814 - 1890

External links 
 Painting of Gustav Wilhelm Kraus: Major exercise by the VIII German Federal Army Corps of Württemberg, Hesse and Baden at Heilbronn, Munich, 1840; in the Württemberg State Library, Stuttgart

Corps of Germany
VIII Army Corps
VIII Army Corps
VIII Army Corps
VIII Army Corps
VIII Army Corps, German Confederation
Military history of Germany